The Strutton Islands are an uninhabited Canadian arctic islands group located within the midsection of James Bay in Nunavut, Canada. They are situated south of Vieux-Comptoir (Old Factory).

History
In 1906, Revillon built a post on the Strutton Islands to compete with the Hudson's Bay Company post at nearby Charlton Island. The Revillon post was able to receive deep sea supply ships which allowed Strutton to become a Revillon warehouse for goods destined for other Revillon posts in the area.

References

Uninhabited islands of Qikiqtaaluk Region
Islands of James Bay